Kintore may refer to two different communities in the Canadian province of New Brunswick:

 Lower Kintore, New Brunswick
 Upper Kintore, New Brunswick